The term childhood disease refers to disease that is contracted or becomes symptomatic before the age of 18 or 21 years old. Many of these diseases can also be contracted by adults.

Some childhood diseases include:

Diseases of neonates and children younger than five years 

 Candida albicans infection
 Candida parapsilosis infection
 Cytomegalovirus infection
 diphtheria
 human coronavirus infection
 respiratory distress syndrome
 measles
 meconium aspiration syndrome
 metapneumovirus (hMPV) infection
 Necrotizing enterocolitis
 Gonorrhea infection of the newborn
 parainfluenza (PIV) infection
 pertussis
 poliomyelitis
 prenatal Listeria
 Group B streptoccus infection
 Tay–Sachs disease
 tetanus
 Ureaplasma urealyticum infection
 respiratory Syncytial Virus infection
 rhinovirus; common cold

Diseases of older children 

 Common cold
 AIDS
 Anemia
 Asthma
 Bronchiolitis
 Cancer
 Candidiasis ("Thrush")
 Chagas disease
 Chickenpox
 Croup
 Cystic fibrosis
 Cytomegalovirus (the virus most frequently transmitted before birth)
 Dental caries
 Type 1 diabetes
 Diphtheria
 Duchenne muscular dystrophy
 Fifth disease
 Congenital Heart Disease
 Infectious mononucleosis
 Influenza
 Intussusception (medical disorder)
 Juvenile idiopathic arthritis
 Leukemia
 Measles
 Meningitis
 Molluscum contagiosum
 Mumps
 Nephrotic syndrome
 Osgood-Schlatter disease
 Osteogenesis Imperfecta (OI)
 Pneumonia
 Polio
 Rheumatic fever
 Rickets
 Roseola
 Rubella
 Sever's disease
 Tetanus
 Tuberculosis
 Volvulus
 Whooping cough
 Hepatitis A
 Scarlet fever (Scarletina)
 Lyme disease
 Xerophthalmia

Lists of diseases